John Collier Frederick Hopkins (12 May 1898 in Stamford Hill, Greater London – 1 October 1981 in Maughold, Isle of Man) was a British mycologist. He was the son of William Henry Hopkins and Edith Eliza Hopkins. 
 
After having served in WWI, and in the Royal Air Force, Hopkins won a Colonial Agricultural Scholarship and spent a year at the Imperial College of Tropical Agriculture in
Trinidad. Having worked for two years in Uganda as an agriculture officer, Hopkins was appointed in 1926 as mycologist in Southern Rhodesia, and from 1946 to 1954 as Chief Botanist and Plant Pathologist. He published numerous papers on the diseases afflicting tobacco and other crops. In 1954 he returned to England as Assistant Director of the Commonwealth Mycological Institute, Kew, and two years later he followed S.P. Wiltshire as Director. On his retirement in 1964 he moved first to Hastings, and then to the Isle of Man where he assembled a collection of fungi. His Tobacco Diseases with Special Reference to Africa (1956) became the standard text on the subject. Hopkins' expertise was much sought after and in consequence he travelled widely. In 1963 he returned to Salisbury to attend the 3rd World Tobacco Scientific Congress arranged by the Tobacco Research Board of Rhodesia and Nyasaland. In 1962 he was made a Companion of the Order of St Michael and St George.

Hopkins married Elizabeth Callister Rothnie (1914-1993) and they had a daughter called Evadne.

References

1898 births
1981 deaths
Royal Air Force airmen
British mycologists